Spodaryushino is a rural locality (a village) in Mokroorlovskoye Selsoviet of Grayvoronsky District, in Belgorod Oblast, Russia. Population:

References 

Rural localities in Grayvoronsky District